Qarah Gol-e Takhteh-ye Vasat (also Romanized as Qarah Gol-e Takhteh-ye Vasaţ; also known as Qarah Gol-e Takht-e Vasaţ) is a village in Maraveh Tappeh Rural District, in the Central District of Maraveh Tappeh County, Golestan Province, Iran. At the 2006 census, its population was 377, in 63 families.

References 

Populated places in Maraveh Tappeh County